The J.B. Daniel House is a historic mansion in Nashville, Tennessee, United States. It is home to the Woman's Club of Nashville. It has been listed on the National Register of Historic Places since July 19, 2010.

See also
 National Register of Historic Places listings in Davidson County, Tennessee

References

Houses in Nashville, Tennessee
Houses on the National Register of Historic Places in Tennessee
National Register of Historic Places in Nashville, Tennessee